Yvonne Dold-Samplonius (20 May 1937 – 16 June 2014) was a Dutch mathematician and historian who specialized in the history of Islamic mathematics during the Middle age. She was particularly interested in the mathematical methods used by Islamic architects and builders of the Middle Ages for measurements of volumes and measurements of religious buildings or in the design of muqarnas.

Biography 

Born on 20 May 1937 in Haarlem, Yvonne Samplonius obtained her degree in mathematics and Arabic from the University of Amsterdam (Doktoratsexamen) in 1966. Yvonne Dold-Samplonius married in 1965 the German mathematician Albrecht Dold. She studied from 1966 to 1967 at Harvard University under the direction of Professor John E. Murdoch. She obtained in 1977 a PhD for her analysis of the treatise Kitāb al-mafrādāt li Aqāţun (Book of Assumptions of Aqātun) under the supervision of Prof. Evert Marie Bruins and Prof. Juan Vernet.

She came into contact with the work of the Persian mathematician, physicist and astronomer Abū Sahl al-Qūhī, who worked in Baghdad in the 10th century and worked on the geometrical forms of buildings. Through his work, she became interested in the geometrical calculations that helped building many domes of palaces and mosques, called muqarnas, in the Arab world and Persia. She wrote articles on the Islamic mathematicians Jamshīd al-Kāshī and Abu-Abdullah Muhammad ibn Īsa Māhānī  in the Dictionary of the Middle Ages and in the Dictionary of Scientific Biography.

In her last years her interest shifted to mathematics in Islamic architecture from an historic point of view. Since 1995, she has been an associate member of the Interdisciplinary Center for Scientific Computing (IWR) of the University of Heidelberg, with whom she has published several videos on Islamic geometrical art. In 1985, she is visiting professor at the University of Siena. In 2000, she organized with Joseph Dauben the conference "2000 Years of Transmission of Mathematical Ideas". In 2002, she became a Corresponding Member of the International Academy of the History of Sciences and was elected effective member in 2007. She was made honorary citizen of Kashan in Iran in 2000.

Publications 
 Yvonne Dold-Samplonius, Dissertation: Book of Assumptions by Aqatun (Kitab al-Mafrudat li-Aqatun), Amsterdam 1977.
 Yvonne Dold-Samplonius : Practical Arabic Mathematics: Measuring the Muqarnas by al-Kashi, Centaurus 35, 193–242, (1992/3).
 Yvonne Dold-Samplonius : How al-Kashi Measures the Muqarnas: A Second Look, M. Folkerts (Ed.), Mathematische Probleme im Mittelalter: Der lateinische und arabische Sprachbereich, Wolfenbütteler Mittelalter-Studien Vol. 10, 56 – 90, Wiesbaden, (1996).
 Yvonne Dold-Samplonius : Calculation of Arches and Domes in 15th Century Samarkand, Nexus Network Journal, Vol. 2(3), (2000).
 Yvonne Dold-Samplonius : Calculating Surface Areas and Volumes in Islamic Architecture, The Enterprise of Science in Islam, New Perspectives, Eds. Jan P. Hogendijk et Abdelhamid I. Sabra, MIT Press, Cambridge Mass. pp. 235–265, (2003).
 Yvonne Dold-Samplonius, Silvia L. Harmsen : The Muqarnas Plate Found at Takht-i Sulaiman, A New Interpretation, Muqarnas Vol. 22, Leiden, pp. 85–94, (2005).

Videos 
 Yvonne Dold-Samplonius, Christoph Kindl, Norbert Quien : Qubba for al-Kashi, Video, Interdisciplinary Center for Scientific Computing (IWR), Heidelberg University, American Mathematical Society, (1996). 
 Yvonne Dold-Samplonius, Silvia L. Harmsen, Susanne Krömker, Michael Winckler : Magic of Muqarnas, Video, Interdisciplinary Center for Scientific Computing (IWR), Heidelberg University, (2005).

References 

1937 births
2014 deaths
20th-century Dutch historians
Dutch women historians
Dutch mathematicians
Dutch women mathematicians
Historians of mathematics
Kashan
Mathematics in the medieval Islamic world
Writers from Haarlem
University of Amsterdam alumni
Women mathematicians
Women historians
21st-century Dutch historians